Yam Bahadur Ghale (born 1963), also known as YB Ghale, is a former forward of the Nepal national football team, as well as a former executive and technical director of the All Nepal Football Association (ANFA).

Career
Ghale, son of late Gaje Ghale, the Victoria Cross recipient, was the key member of the Nepali squad which won gold medal in football during the First South Asian Games in 1984. It is the greatest achievement of Nepali football team in international arena. Ghale who ended his career as player in 1994, featured in top flight domestic football from Ranipokhari Corner Team (RCT), Friends Club, Royal Nepal Airlines Club (RNAC) and Mahendra Police Club (now Nepal Police Club).

Retirement
His continued to contribute to Nepali football after his retirement as a player. He served as an executive member of ANFA for a term in 1996. He was also the technical director of ANFA and also the coach of top flight Jawalakhel Youth Club in 1995. Ghale, father of a five-year-old son, shoulders the responsibility of a family of five. He was speechless when asked about his feelings for being ignored by ANFA after spending the prime-time of his life for football.

Speaking during the function, Rohan Benjankar said the fund was raised to honor Ghale´s contribution to Nepali football. He also pledged to support football in future as well. According to Benjankar, he sold T-shirts in different cities of America and also used his personal funds to raise the funds. Upendra Man Singh, the president of Nepali National Football Players Association, said, "It is disappointing to see that none of the people residing in the country have cared for him."

Health
As of 2012, YB Ghale has been bedridden for the last 4 years after suffering from stroke, which resulted in paralysis. ANFA, the most powerful and financially sound sports association in the country, has not provided any support for Ghale´s treatment. Ghale´s wife Jamuna KC received  for his treatment from Nepali football fans residing outside Nepal. The amount was raised under the coordination of Rohan Benjankar, a former player and lifelong member of Friends Club of Lalitpur, who lives in the United States of America. Ghale, considered as Nepal´s all-time greatest footballer, has his right side of body paralyzed and is unable to move by himself. Ghale has undergone treatment at the Apollo Hospital in New Delhi for nearly eight times after he was referred for treatment in Delhi by Norvic Hospital.

Rohan Benjankar along with Achyut Timilsina, Mahesh Shrestha, Bishal Paudel, Jeevan Pradhan, Bijay Gurung (Hong Kong), Bhes Pun, Atul Bhattarai, Arjun Aryal (Canada), Sitaram Chaudhary (Qatar) and Dhruba Bakhati (UAE) contributed in raising the funds.

Honours

Nepal
 South Asian Games Gold medal: 1984; Silver medal: 1987

See also
Raju Kaji Shakya
Hari Khadka
All Nepal Football Association

References

External links
 

1960 births
Living people
Sportspeople from Kathmandu
Nepalese footballers
Nepal international footballers
Ranipokhari Corner Team players
Association football forwards
South Asian Games gold medalists for Nepal
South Asian Games silver medalists for Nepal
South Asian Games medalists in football